Karim Akbari Mobarakeh (6 June 1953 – 29 October 2020) was an Iranian actor and film director, well known for the cast of Abd-al-Rahman ibn Muljam in Imam Ali series. He acted in Mokhtarnameh as Ahmar ibn Shomait. 

He died from COVID-19 during the COVID-19 pandemic in Iran.

Education 
Karim Akbari Mobarakeh graduated in acting and directing field and acquired bachelor's degree certification from Tehran University.

Early works
He acted as a theatrical role in 1971 and started working for IRIB in 1980.

Filmography 
 Director
 Hanei and Crafty Fox (1988)

 Director assistant
 Condemned Men to Paradise (2005)

Actor
 Rooster (2013)
 Life Days (2011)
 Wound (2010)
 Mokhtarnameh (2009)
 How Much Do You Want to Cry? (2005)
 Imam Ali (1996)
 Knighthood (1995)
 Meeting (1994)
 Separation (1993-1994)
 Travelers (1993)
 Wolves (1986-1987)
 Hanai and Crafty Fox (1988)
 Root in Soil (1988)
 Scops Owl (1988)
 Surgery Department Number 4 (1988)
 Tolerance (1986)
 Pir Vafa (1985)
 Death of Yazdegerd III (1982)

References

External links 
 Karim Akbari Mobarakeh imdb.com (In English)
 	 کریم اکبری مبارکه سوره (In Persian)
 بیوگرافی کریم اکبری مبارکه biographyema.com (In Persian)
 کریم اکبری مبارکه  انجمن بازیگران خانه تئاتر (In Persian)
 چهره بدون گریم کریم اکبری مبارکه فارس نیوز (In Persian)
 بازیگر نقش ابن ملجم چطور انتخاب شد؟/تصویر  جام فرهنگی (In Persian)
 عکس‌هایی از کریم اکبری مبارکه biographyema.com (In Persian)
 عکس کریم اکبری مبارکه در نقش بن شمیط در سریال مختارنامه (In Persian)

Iranian male film actors
Iranian male stage actors
Iranian male television actors
1953 births
2020 deaths
Male actors from Tehran
Deaths from the COVID-19 pandemic in Iran